The Far Shore is a Canadian drama film, directed by David Uloth and released in 2018. The film centres on teenage sisters Océane (Éléonore Loiselle) and Marine (Maèva Tremblay) Beauregard, who are coming of age in the aftermath of the death of their father André (Réal Bossé), while their mother Catherine (Mélissa Désormeaux-Poulin) is struggling to cope with the loss or properly take care of her daughters.

The film's cast also includes Emmanuel Schwartz, Émilie Bierre and Isabelle Nélisse.

The film's screenplay was written by Chloé Cinq-Mars, Uloth's real-life wife, based in part on her own childhood. The film premiered on September 29, 2018 at the Vancouver International Film Festival, before opening commercially in March 2019.

The film received two Prix Iris nominations at the 21st Quebec Cinema Awards, for Best Supporting Actress (Désormeaux-Poulin) and Best Casting (Cinq-Mars).

References

External links
 

2018 films
2018 drama films
Canadian coming-of-age drama films
Quebec films
French-language Canadian films
2010s Canadian films